Setanta may refer to:
 The given name of the Irish mythological figure Cú Chulainn
 Ireland-based higher education institution Setanta College
 Setanta Sports, Ireland-based international television sports channel
Setanta Sports USA, defunct version of the above that broadcast in the US and Caribbean from 2005–2010
 Setanta Records, record label
 LÉ Setanta, former Irish Naval Service ship
 Setanta Ó hAilpín, Irish sportsman
 The number 70 in Catalan Language
 Setanta (wasp), a genus of parasitoid wasps

See also
 Satanta (disambiguation)